Hubert Miles Gladwyn Jebb, 1st Baron Gladwyn   (25 April 1900 – 24 October 1996) was a prominent British civil servant, diplomat and politician who served as the acting secretary-general of the United Nations between 1945 and 1946.

Early life and career 
The son of Sydney Jebb, of Firbeck Hall, Yorkshire, Jebb attended Sandroyd School and Eton College before graduating from Magdalen College, Oxford with a first class honours in history. 

In 1929, he married Cynthia Noble, daughter of Sir Saxton Noble, 3rd Baronet. Noble was the granddaughter of Sir Andrew Noble, 1st Baronet and the great-granddaughter of Isambard Kingdom Brunel. The couple had three children, one son and two daughters: Miles, Vanessa, married to the historian Hugh Thomas, and Stella, married to scientist Joel de Rosnay. Jebb's granddaughter is the French writer Tatiana de Rosnay.

Jebb entered the British Diplomatic Service in 1924 and served in Tehran, where he became known to Harold Nicolson and to Vita Sackville-West. He later served in Rome as well as at the Foreign Office in London, where he served in such positions as Private Secretary to the Head of the Diplomatic Service.

Acting UN Secretary-General 
After the Second World War, Jebb served as Executive Secretary of the Preparatory Commission of the United Nations in August 1945 and served as Acting United Nations Secretary-General from October 1945 to February 1946, when the first Secretary-General was appointed, Trygve Lie.

Jebb remains the only UN Secretary-General or Acting Secretary-General to come from a permanent member state of the UN Security Council.

Ambassador 

Returning to London, Jebb served as Deputy to the Foreign Secretary Ernest Bevin at the Conference of Foreign Ministers before serving as the Foreign Office's United Nations Adviser (1946–1947). He represented the United Kingdom at the Brussels Treaty Permanent Commission with personal rank of ambassador.

Jebb became the United Kingdom's Ambassador to the United Nations from 1950 to 1954 and to Paris from 1954 to 1960. He was the UK's first permanent UN representative. In the latter role, he was angered that secret negotiations between the British, French and Israelis in advance of the Suez invasion in 1956 took place at Sèvres without his knowledge and, in certain respects, that he was sidelined by Prime Minister Harold Macmillan at the Paris "big power" summit in 1960.

Jebb's rather "grand" manner caused Foreign Secretary Selwyn Lloyd to coin an epigram: "You're a deb, Sir Gladwyn Jebb".

Political career 

Jebb was knighted in 1949. On 12 April 1960 Jebb was created a hereditary peer and as Baron Gladwyn, of Bramfield in the County of Suffolk. London Gazette He became involved in politics as a member of the Liberal Party. He was Deputy Leader of the Liberals in the House of Lords from 1965 to 1988 and spokesman on foreign affairs and defence. An ardent European, he served as a Member of the European Parliament from 1973 to 1976, where he was also the Vice-President of the Parliament's Political Committee. Jebb unsuccessfully contested the Suffolk seat in the European Parliament in 1979.

When asked in the early 1960s why he had joined the Liberal Party, he replied that the Liberals were a party without a general and that he was a general without a party. Like many Liberals, he passionately believed that education was the key to social reform.

Death 

Jebb died on 24 October 1996 at the age of 96, the 51st anniversary of the founding of the United Nations. He is buried at St Andrew's Church, Bramfield in Suffolk.

Honours 

 GCVO, 1957
 Companion of the Bath, 1947
 Grand Croix de la Légion d'Honneur, 1957

Publications and papers 

Publications by Jebb include:

 Is Tension Necessary?, 1959
 Peaceful Coexistence, 1962
 The European Idea, 1966
 Half-way to 1984, 1967
 De Gaulle's Europe, or, Why the General says No, 1969
 Europe after de Gaulle, 1970
 The Memoirs of Lord Gladwyn, 1972

The papers of 1st Lord Gladwyn were deposited at Churchill Archives Centre at the University of Cambridge by his son, 2nd Lord Gladwyn, between 1998 and 2000.

Reference in The Goon Show
In the episode of The Goon Show (9th series, episode 16, broadcast 16th February 1959) entitled "The Gold Plate Robbery", Major Bloodnok – in his rôle as 'the last British Ambassador in Marrakesh' – is heard to muse aloud "Now, for a kip on full Ambassador's pay. Gad! I wonder what old Gladwyn Jebb's doing". The venal Bloodnok then agrees to provide his old enemy the tribal leader The Red Bladder (played by Ray Ellington) with weapons and ammunition in return for a stolen gold plate, which, when quizzed, Bloodnok claims is actually the gold disc which he won for his hit record I don't know who you are, sir, or where you come from, but you've done me a power of good – the song of which he then proceeds to sing.

References

Bibliography 

 Sean Greenwood, Titan at the Foreign Office: Gladwyn Jebb and the Shaping of the Modern World (Leiden, Brill, 2008) (History of International Relations, Diplomacy, and Intelligence, 5).

External links 
 Cambridge Archives Centre – Gladwyn Papers
 

1900 births
1996 deaths
Alumni of Magdalen College, Oxford
Ambassadors of the United Kingdom to France
British expatriates in Iran
British memoirists
British officials of the United Nations
Companions of the Order of the Bath
Diplomatic peers
People educated at Eton College
English Anglicans
Grand Croix of the Légion d'honneur
Hereditary barons created by Elizabeth II
Knights Grand Cross of the Order of St Michael and St George
Knights Grand Cross of the Royal Victorian Order
Liberal Party (UK) hereditary peers
Liberal Party (UK) MEPs
MEPs for the United Kingdom 1973–1979
People educated at Sandroyd School
Permanent Representatives of the United Kingdom to the United Nations
Secretaries-General of the United Nations